Sipaliwini River is a river of Suriname, the main source of the Courantyne River. It gives its name to the village of Sipaliwini Savanna and to the Sipaliwini District. It flows through the village of Kwamalasamutu. The name translates to thornback ray (sipari) river in the local Maroon dialect.

See also
List of rivers of Suriname

References
Rand McNally, The New International Atlas, 1993.

Rivers of Suriname